"I Got Mine" is the second single from The Black Keys' album Attack & Release. It was released in June 2008. The song was number 23 on Rolling Stones list of the 100 Best Songs of 2008.

In popular culture
The song "I Got Mine" has been used in HBO's sports reality series 24/7: Pacquiao-Hatton as well as background music for the 2009 American League Championship Series. The song is also used as the opening theme music for the CTV/CBS Canadian police drama The Bridge. The song has been performed many times live on television, including the Late Show with David Letterman in April 2008. The band Illinoise regularly performs this song at shows as part of their setlist. It was also sampled by Ski Beatz on the song "I Got Mines" on the album 24 Hour Karate School. It appears in the films The A-Team, The Watch, Homefront, and Tomorrowland. "I Got Mine" is also featured in the video game Tony Hawk: Ride.

Track listing
 "I Got Mine" (Radio Edit)(Auerbach, Carney)
 "Here I Am I Always Am" (Captain Beefheart; live at Suma Studios, Ohio) (7" vinyl only)
 "I Got Mine" (Album Version - CD Track 2)(Auerbach, Carney)

Personnel 
Dan Auerbach – vocals, guitars
Patrick Carney – drums, percussion
Carla Monday – harmony vocals
Ralph Carney – jaw harp

References

The Black Keys songs
2008 songs
Songs written by Dan Auerbach
Songs written by Patrick Carney
Song recordings produced by Danger Mouse (musician)
V2 Records singles